Duško Kondor (10 June 1947 – 22 February 2007) was a Bosnian Serb human rights activist, a co-founder of the Helsinki Committee for Human Rights in Bosnia and Herzegovina (leading its Human Rights Education department), and a professor of sociology and philosophy.

Assassination
Kondor and his daughter were attacked on 22 February 2007 by local gangsters with machine guns. He was killed while she was severely injured. Kondor had been a witness to the killings of 23 Bosniaks in Bijeljina and was cooperating with the State Investigation and Protection Agency of Bosnia and Herzegovina. Christian Schwarz-Schilling, the High Representative for Bosnia and Herzegovina at the time, condemned the killing and expressed his condolences to the family.

Jasmin Baraković, a Bosnian Muslim from Bijeljina was arrested and convicted to 20 years imprisonment. Baraković had previously stalked Kondor's daughter for two years. Kondor had informed the police twice that he had received threats from Baraković and sought protection, but they did not take the threats seriously and failed to take action.

The Duško Kondor Civil Courage Award was created to commemorate him and is awarded annually.

Notes

References
 
 
 
 
 
 
 

1947 births
2007 deaths
People from Bijeljina
Serbs of Bosnia and Herzegovina
Serbian human rights activists
2000s murders in Bosnia and Herzegovina
Deaths by firearm in Bosnia and Herzegovina